Li Yanjun (simplified Chinese: 李延军, born March 18, 1963) is a Chinese volleyball player who competed in the 1984 Summer Olympics.

In 1984, she was a member of the Chinese volleyball team which won the gold medal. She played four matches including the final. She won the 1985 World Cup and the 1986 World Championship.

Awards

National team
 1984 Olympic Games Los Angeles -  Gold Medal
 1985 World Cup -  Gold Medal
 1986 World Championship -  Gold Medal

External links
 profile

1963 births
Living people
Chinese women's volleyball players
Volleyball players at the 1984 Summer Olympics
Olympic volleyball players of China
Olympic gold medalists for China
Volleyball players from Liaoning
Olympic medalists in volleyball
Asian Games medalists in volleyball
Volleyball players at the 1986 Asian Games
Medalists at the 1984 Summer Olympics
People from Fushun
Medalists at the 1986 Asian Games
Asian Games gold medalists for China
20th-century Chinese women